Margaret Anne Knowles is professor of cancer research at Leeds Institute of Medical Research at St James's, where she has led research on bladder cancer. In 2016 she was awarded the St Peter's Medal of the British Association of Urological Surgeons.

References

Living people
20th-century British medical doctors
21st-century British medical doctors
British medical writers
British non-fiction writers
Recipients of the St Peter's Medal
Year of birth missing (living people)